Godomar II (or Gundomar), son of king Gundobad, was king of Burgundy. He ruled Burgundy after his elder brother's death in 524 until 534. 

Both he and his brother Sigismund of Burgundy were defeated in battle by Clovis' sons. Godomar fled and Sigismund was taken prisoner by Chlodomer, King of Orléans. Godomar then rallied the Burgundian army. With this army, he regained his territory. Meanwhile, Chlodomer ordered the death of Sigismund and marched with his brother Theuderic I, King of Metz, on Burgundy in 524. Godomar and his army fled, but Godomar was pursued. In 534, the Franks killed Godomar and took over the country of Burgundy.

References
 Reinhold Kaiser: The Burgundians. Kohlhammer Verlag, Stuttgart 2004, 

Kings of the Burgundians
534 deaths
Arian Christians
6th-century Arian Christians
6th-century monarchs in Europe
Year of birth unknown